The New Paradise is a 1921 German silent film directed by Willy Zeyn and starring Esther Carena, Max Adalbert and Arthur Bergen.

The film's sets were designed by the art director Franz Schroedter.

Cast
 Esther Carena
 Max Adalbert
 Arthur Bergen
 Frida Richard
 Anna Müller-Lincke
 Ferry Sikla
 Maria Voigtsberger

References

Bibliography
 Paolo Caneppele. Entscheidungen der Tiroler Filmzensur 1919-1920-1921: mit einem Index der in Tirol verbotenen Filme 1916–1922. Film Archiv Austria, 2002.

External links

1921 films
Films of the Weimar Republic
German silent feature films
Films directed by Willy Zeyn
German black-and-white films
1920s German films